The Marvel Comics Video Library, released by Prism Entertainment, was a series of  VHS/Betamax tapes that featured episodes from animated series based on Marvel Comics characters. A total of 24 tapes were released and included episodes from Spider-Man (1967), Spider-Man (1981), The Marvel Super Heroes, Fantastic Four (1978), The Incredible Hulk (1982) and Spider-Woman. Each tape ran for approximately 60 minutes, and included 2 full episodes. The first episode could be from any of the series, but the second episode was always from the 1981 or 1967 Spider-Man series.

The volumes were released in a numerical sequence, and each one featured a title and cover relating to a character that appears in one or both of the episodes on the tape. Most covers included the title of one of the episodes as well. The videos came in a slightly oversized case with artwork from Marvel Comics on the outside, complete with episode descriptions on the back.

Characters featured included heroes such as Spider-Man, Hulk, Sub-Mariner, Captain America, Thor and Iron Man as well as villains such as Dr. Doom, the Vulture, Green Goblin, Magneto.

The intent was to keep going with the series until every available episode of the various series were released on tape. However, Prism canceled the arrangement after two cycles were released, one with the hero's names and one with a villain's name.

Volumes

DVD release 
Several DVD volumes (8) were released in 2008 by Morningstar Ent. in Canada. However, these were direct Betamax transfers, (using the Betamax BII linear audio track which resulted in muffled sound, even though all the Beta releases had had their audio recorded in Beta Hi-Fi) and were not remastered in any way, Apparently because of legal reasons. Also, strangely, None of the DVDs mention MARVEL COMICS or ENTERTAINMENT anywhere.

They Included:

Doctor Doom: Meet Doctor Doom,
The Incredible Hulk: When Monsters Meet,
The Fly: Spider-Woman And The Fly,
Fantastic Four: The Impossible Man,
Doctor Octopus: The Power of Doctor Octopus,
The Vulture: The Vulture Has Landed,
Thor: Enter Hercules &
The Red Skull: The Origin Of The Red Skull

References 

Marvel Comics animation